This is a list of commercial banks in Cameroon

 Access Bank Cameroon
Afriland First Bank
 Atlantic Bank Cameroon
 Banque International du Cameroun pour l'Epargne et le Crédit (BICEC)
 Banque Camerounaise des Petites et Moyennes Entreprises (BC-PME SA)
 BGFI Bank Cameroon
 SCB Cameroun
Crédit Communautaire d'Afrique Bank (CCA Bank)
 Citibank
 Commercial Bank of Cameroon
 Ecobank Cameroon - Acquired Oceanic Bank Cameroon
 National Financial Credit Bank (NFCB)
 Société Commerciale de Banque du Cameroun - (Formerly SCB Credit Agricole)
 Wineex Bank Cameroon (WBC)
 Societe Generale des Banques au Cameroun (SGBC)
 Standard Chartered Bank
 Union Bank of Cameroon  (UBC)
 United Bank for Africa  (UBA)
 Attijari Securities Central Africa (ASCA)

See also
 List of banks in Africa
 Central Bank of Central African States

References

External links
 Website of Central Bank of Central African States (French)
 Addresses of Some Commercial Banks In Cameroon
 Many New Banks Entering Cameroon

 
Banks
Cameroon
Cameroon